Heart of a Child is a 1940 novel by the British writer Phyllis Bottome. Set in Vienna, it focuses on a boy and his pet Saint Bernard

Adaptation
In 1958 it was adapted into a film of the same title directed by Clive Donner and starring Jean Anderson, Donald Pleasence and Maureen Pryor.

References

Bibliography
 Goble, Alan. The Complete Index to Literary Sources in Film. Walter de Gruyter, 1999.
 Jones, Amanda. Bringing Up War-Babies: The Wartime Child in Women’s Writing and Psychoanalysis at Mid-Century. Routledge, 2018.

1940 British novels
Novels by Phyllis Bottome
British novels adapted into films
Novels set in Vienna
Faber and Faber books